World Camp may refer to:

World Camp (Guiding)
Fimcap World Camp (Catholic youth)